Enlightenment is a concept found in several religions, including Buddhist terms and concepts, most notably bodhi, kensho, and satori. It represents kaivalya and moksha (liberation) in Hinduism,  Kevala Jnana in Jainism, and ushta in Zoroastrianism.

In Christianity, the word "enlightenment" is rarely used, except to refer to the Age of Enlightenment and its influence on Christianity. Roughly equivalent terms in Christianity may be illumination, kenosis, metanoia, revelation, salvation, theosis, and conversion.

Perennialists and Universalists view enlightenment and mysticism as equivalent terms for religious or spiritual insight.

Asian cultures and religions

Buddhism

The English term enlightenment is the western translation of the abstract noun bodhi, the knowledge, wisdom, or awakened intellect of a Buddha. The verbal root, Budh, derived from Vedic Sanskrit, means "to awaken" or "awakening." 

Enlightenment is also used to translate several other Buddhist terms and concepts, which are used to denote insight (prajna, kensho and satori); knowledge (vidhya); the "blowing out" (Nirvana) of disturbing emotions and desires and the subsequent freedom or release (vimutti); and the attainment of Buddhahood, as exemplified by Gautama Buddha. The Buddha’s awakening constituted the knowledge that liberation, attained by mindfulness and dhyāna, and applied to the understanding of the arising and ceasing of craving. 

Although it is most commonly used in Buddhist contexts, the term buddhi is also used in other Indian philosophies and traditions. 

In the western world, the term "enlightenment" was popularized in the Western world through the 19th century translations of Max Müller. It has the western connotation of a sudden insight into a transcendental truth or reality. The concept of spiritual enlightenment has become synonymous with self-realization, or the recognition of the true self, regarded as the essence of being, and the seeing through of the false self, the layers of social conditioning which overcover the true self.,

Hinduism

In Indian religions, moksha (liberation) or mukti (release —both from the root  "to let loose, let go") is the final extrication of the soul or consciousness (purusha) from samsara and the bringing to an end of all the suffering involved in being subject to the cycle of repeated death and rebirth (reincarnation).

Advaita Vedanta

Advaita Vedanta (IAST ; Sanskrit: अद्वैत वेदान्त ) is a philosophical concept where followers seek liberation by recognizing identity of the Self (Atman) and the Whole (Brahman) through long preparation, usually under the guidance of a guru. It involves efforts such as knowledge of scriptures, renunciation of worldly activities, and inducement of direct identity experiences. Ramana Maharshi, however, recalled his death experience as akrama mukti, "sudden liberation", as opposed to the krama mukti, "gradual liberation" as in the Vedanta path of Jnana yoga.

Neo-Vedanta

Vivekananda's interpretation of Advaita Vedanta has been called "Neo-Vedanta". 

In a talk on "The absolute and manifestation" given in at London in 1896 Swami Vivekananda said,

Vivekananda emphasized samadhi as a means to attain liberation. Yet his emphasis is not to be found in the Upanishads nor in Shankara. For Shankara, meditation and Nirvikalpa Samadhi are means to gain knowledge of the already existing unity of Brahman and Atman, not the highest goal itself:

Vivekenanda's modernisation has been criticized:

Neo-Advaita

Neo-Advaita is a new religious movement based on a modern, Western interpretation of Advaita Vedanta, especially the teachings of Ramana Maharshi. Neo-Advaita is being criticized for discarding the traditional prerequisites of knowledge of the scriptures and "renunciation as necessary preparation for the path of jnana-yoga". Notable neo-advaita teachers are H. W. L. Poonja, his students Gangaji Andrew Cohen,, Madhukar and Eckhart Tolle.

Yoga

The prime means to reach moksha is through the practice of yoga (Sanskrit, Pāli: , /ˈjəʊɡə/). Specifically, yoga is one of the six āstika ("orthodox") schools of Hindu philosophy. Various traditions of yoga are found in Hinduism, Buddhism, Jainism and Sikhism.

Pre–philosophical speculations and diverse ascetic practices of first millennium BCE were systematized into a formal philosophy in early centuries CE by the Yoga Sutras of Patanjali. By the turn of the first millennium, Hatha yoga emerged as a prominent tradition of yoga distinct from the Patanjali's Yoga Sutras. While the Yoga Sutras focus on discipline of the mind, Hatha yoga concentrates on health and purity of the body.

Hindu monks, beginning with Swami Vivekananda, brought yoga to the West in the late 19th century. In the 1980s, yoga became popular as a physical system of health exercises across the Western world. Many studies have tried to determine the effectiveness of yoga as a complementary intervention for cancer, schizophrenia, asthma and heart patients. In a national survey, long-term yoga practitioners in the United States reported musculo–skeletal and mental health improvements.

Jnana yoga

Classical Advaita Vedanta emphasises the path of jnana yoga, a progression of study and training to attain moksha. It consists of four stages:
 Samanyasa or Sampattis, the "fourfold discipline" (sādhana-catustaya), cultivating the following four qualities:
  (नित्यानित्य वस्तु विवेकम्) – The ability to correctly discriminate (viveka) between the eternal (nitya) substance (Brahman) and the substance that is transitory existence (anitya).
  (इहाऽमुत्रार्थ फल भोगविरागम्) – The renunciation (virāga) of enjoyments of objects (artha phala bhoga) in this world (iha) and the other worlds (amutra) like heaven etc.
  (शमादि षट्क सम्पत्ति) – the sixfold qualities,
 Śama (control of the ).
 Dama (the control of external sense organs).
 Uparati (the cessation of these external organs so restrained, from the pursuit of objects other than that, or it may mean the abandonment of the prescribed works according to scriptural injunctions).
  (the tolerating of ).
  (the faith in Guru and Vedas).
  (the concentrating of the mind on God and Guru).
  (मुमुक्षुत्वम्) – The firm conviction that the nature of the world is misery and the intense longing for moksha (release from the cycle of births and deaths).
 Sravana, listening to the teachings of the sages on the Upanishads and Advaita Vedanta, and studying the Vedantic texts, such as the Brahma Sutras. In this stage the student learns about the reality of Brahman and the identity of atman;
 Manana, the stage of reflection on the teachings;
 Dhyana, the stage of meditation on the truth "that art Thou".

Bhakti yoga

The paths of bhakti yoga and karma yoga are subsidiary. In bhakti yoga, practice centers on the worship of God, like Krishna or Ayyappa, in any way and in any form. Adi Shankara himself was a proponent of devotional worship or Bhakti. He taught that while Vedic sacrifices, puja, and devotional worship can lead one in the direction of jnana (true knowledge), they cannot lead one directly to moksha. At best, they can serve as means to obtain moksha via shukla gati.

Karma yoga

Karma yoga is the way of doing our duties, in disregard of personal gains or losses. According to Sri Swami Sivananda,

Jainism

Jainism (Samaṇam,  Jainmat), is an Indian religion that prescribes a path of non-violence towards all living beings. Its philosophy and practice emphasize the necessity of self-effort to move the soul toward divine consciousness and liberation. Any soul that has conquered its inner enemies and achieved the state of supreme being is called a jina ("conqueror" or "victor"). The ultimate status of these perfect souls is called siddha. Ancient texts also refer to Jainism as shramana dharma (self-reliant) or the "path of the nirganthas" (those without attachments or aversions). In Jainism, enlightenment is called as "Keval Gyan" and the one who atains it is known as a "Kevalin". 

In Jainism, the highest form of pure knowledge a soul can attain is called Kevala Jnana (Sanskrit: केवलज्ञान) or Kevala Ṇāṇa (Prakrit: केवल णाण), which means "absolute or perfect," and Jñāna, which means "knowledge". Kevala is the state of isolation of the jīva from the ajīva, attained through ascetic practices which burn off one's karmic residues, releasing one from bondage to the cycle of death and rebirth. Kevala Jñāna thus means infinite knowledge of self and non-self, attained by a soul after annihilation of the all ghātiyā karmas. The soul which has reached this stage achieves moksa or liberation at the end of its life span.

Mahavira, 24th thirthankara of Jainism, is said to have practised rigorous austerities for 12 years before he attained enlightenment,

Kevala Jñāna is one of the five major events in the life of a Tirthankara and is known as Keval Jñāna Kalyanaka and celebrated of all gods. Lord Mahavira's Kaivalya was said to have been celebrated by the demi-gods, who constructed the Samosarana or a grand preaching assembly for him.

Western understanding

In the Western world, the concept of enlightenment in a religious context usually posits a romantic meaning. It has become synonymous with self-realization and the true self, which is being regarded as a substantial essence, covered over by social conditioning.

As Aufklärung

The use of the Western word enlightenment is based on the supposed resemblance of bodhi with Aufklärung, the independent use of reason to gain insight into the true nature of our world. There are more resemblances with Romanticism than with the Enlightenment: the emphasis on feeling, on intuitive insight, and on a true essence beyond the world of appearances.

Awakening: Historical period of renewed interest in religion

The term "awakening", equivalent to "enlightenment," has also been used in a Christian context, namely the Great Awakenings, several periods of religious revival in American religious history. Historians and theologians identify three or four waves of increased religious enthusiasm occurring between the early 18th century and the late 19th century. Each of these "Great Awakenings" was characterized by widespread revivals led by evangelical Protestant ministers, a sharp increase of interest in religion, a profound sense of conviction and redemption on the part of those affected, an increase in evangelical church membership, and the formation of new religious movements and denominations.

Illumination

Another equivalent term is Illuminationism, which was also used by Paul Demieville in his work The Mirror of the Mind, in which he made a distinction between "illumination subie" and "illumination graduelle". Illuminationism is a doctrine according to which the process of human thought needs to be aided by divine grace. It is the oldest and most influential alternative to naturalism in the theory of mind and epistemology.  It was an important feature of ancient Greek philosophy, Neoplatonism, medieval philosophy, and in particular, the Illuminationist school of Islamic philosophy.

Augustine was an important proponent of Illuminationism, stating that everything we know is taught to us by God as He casts His light over the world, saying that "The mind needs to be enlightened by light from outside itself, so that it can participate in truth, because it is not itself the nature of truth. You will light my lamp, Lord,"  and "You hear nothing true from me which you have not first told me." Augustine's version of illuminationism is not that God gives us certain information, but rather gives us insight into the truth of the information we received for ourselves.

Romanticism and transcendentalism

This romantic idea of enlightenment as insight into a timeless, transcendent reality has been popularized especially by D.T. Suzuki. Further popularization was due to the writings of Heinrich Dumoulin. Dumoulin viewed metaphysics as the expression of a transcendent truth, which according to him was expressed by Mahayana Buddhism, but not by the pragmatic analysis of the oldest Buddhism, which emphasizes anatta. This romantic vision is also recognizable in the works of Ken Wilber.

In the oldest Buddhism this essentialism is not recognizable. According to critics it doesn't really contribute to a real insight into Buddhism:

Experience

A common reference in Western culture is the notion of "enlightenment experience". This notion can be traced back to William James, who used the term "religious experience" in his book, The Varieties of Religious Experience. Wayne Proudfoot traces the roots of the notion of "religious experience" further back to the German theologian Friedrich Schleiermacher (1768–1834), who argued that religion is based on a feeling of the infinite. The notion of "religious experience" was used by Schleiermacher to defend religion against the growing scientific and secular critique.

It was popularised by the Transcendentalists, and exported to Asia via missionaries. Transcendentalism developed as a reaction against 18th-century rationalism, John Locke's philosophy of Sensualism, and the predestinationism of New England Calvinism. It is fundamentally a variety of diverse sources such as Hindu texts like the Vedas, the Upanishads and the Bhagavad Gita, various religions, and German idealism.

It was adopted by many scholars of religion, of which William James was the most influential.

The notion of "experience" has been criticised. Robert Sharf points out that "experience" is a typical Western term, which has found its way into Asian religiosity via western influences. The notion of "experience" introduces a false notion of duality between "experiencer" and "experienced", whereas the essence of kensho is the realisation of the "non-duality" of observer and observed. "Pure experience" does not exist; all experience is mediated by intellectual and cognitive activity. The specific teachings and practices of a specific tradition may even determine what "experience" someone has, which means that this "experience" is not the proof of the teaching, but a result of the teaching. A pure consciousness without concepts, reached by "cleansing the doors of perception", would be an overwhelming chaos of sensory input without coherence.

Nevertheless, the notion of religious experience has gained widespread use in the study of religion, and is extensively researched.

Western culture

Socrates to Platonism

Socrates' & Plato's dialogues discuss enlightenment, with a large part being Republic: allegory of the cave.

Christianity

The word "enlightenment" is not generally used in Christian contexts for religious understanding or insight. More commonly used terms in the Christian tradition are religious conversion and revelation.

Lewis Sperry Chafer (1871–1952), one of the founders of Dispensationalism, uses the word "illuminism". Christians who are "illuminated" are of two groups, those who have experienced true illuminism (biblical) and those who experienced false illuminism (not from the Holy Spirit).

Christian interest in eastern spirituality has grown throughout the 20th century. Notable Christians, such as Hugo Enomiya-Lassalle and AMA Samy, have participated in Buddhist training and even become Buddhist teachers themselves. In a few places Eastern contemplative techniques have been integrated in Christian practices, such as centering prayer. But this integration has also raised questions about the borders between these traditions.

Western esotericism and mysticism

Western and Mediterranean culture has a rich tradition of esotericism and mysticism. The Perennial philosophy, basic to the New Age understanding of the world, regards those traditions as akin to Eastern religions which aim at awakening/ enlightenment and developing wisdom. The hypothesis that all mystical traditions share a "common core", is central to New Age, but contested by a diversity of scientists like Katz and Proudfoot.

Judaism includes the mystical tradition of Kabbalah. Islam includes the mystical tradition of Sufism. In the Fourth Way teaching, enlightenment is the highest state of Man (humanity).

Nondualism

A popular western understanding sees "enlightenment" as "nondual consciousness", "a primordial, natural awareness without subject or object". It is used interchangeably with Neo-Advaita.

This nondual consciousness is seen as a common stratum to different religions. Several definitions or meanings are combined in this approach, which makes it possible to recognize various traditions as having the same essence. According to Renard, many forms of religion are based on an experiential or intuitive understanding of "the Real"

This idea of nonduality as "the central essence" is part of a modern mutual exchange and synthesis of ideas between western spiritual and esoteric traditions and Asian religious revival and reform movements. Western predecessors are, among others, New Age, Wilber's synthesis of western psychology and Asian spirituality, the idea of a Perennial Philosophy, and Theosophy. Eastern influences are the Hindu reform movements such as Aurobindo's Integral Yoga and Vivekananda's Neo-Vedanta, the Vipassana movement, and Buddhist modernism. A truly syncretistic influence is Osho and the Rajneesh movement, a hybrid of eastern and western ideas and teachings, and a mainly western group of followers.

Cognitive aspects

Religious experience as cognitive construct

"Religious experiences" have "evidential value", since they confirm the specific worldview of the experiencer:

Yet, just like the very notion of "religious experience" is shaped by a specific discourse and habitus, the "uniformity of interpretation" may be due to the influence of religious traditions which shape the interpretation of such experiences.

Various religious experiences

Yandell discerns various "religious experiences" and their corresponding doctrinal settings, which differ in structure and phenomenological content, and in the "evidential value" they present. Yandell discerns five sorts:
 Numinous experiences – Monotheism (Jewish, Christian, Vedantic, Sufi Islam)
 Nirvanic experiences – Buddhism, "according to which one sees that the self is but a bundle of fleeting states"
 Kevala experiences – Jainism, "according to which one sees the self as an indestructible subject of experience"
 Moksha experiences – Hinduism, Brahman "either as a cosmic person, or, quite differently, as qualityless"
 Nature mystical experience

Cognitive science

Various philosophers and cognitive scientists state that there is no "true self" or a "little person" (homunculus) in the brain that "watches the show," and that consciousness is an emergent property that arise from the various modules of the brain in ways that are yet far from understood. According to Susan Greenfield, the "self" may be seen as a composite, whereas Douglas R. Hofstadter describes the sense of "I" as a result of cognitive process.

This is in line with the Buddhist teachings, which state that

To this end, Parfit called Buddha the "first bundle theorist".

Entheogens

Several users of entheogens throughout the ages have claimed experiences of spiritual enlightenment with the use of these substances, their use and prevalence through history is well recorded, and continues today.  In modern times we have seen increased interest in these practices, for example the rise of interest in Ayahuasca. The psychological effects of these substances have been subject to scientific research focused on understanding their physiological basis.  While entheogens do produce glimpses of higher spiritual states, these are always temporary, fading with the effects of the substance.  Permanent enlightenment requires making permanent changes in your consciousness.

See also

Notes

References

Sources

Published sources

 
 
 
 
 
 
 
 
 
 
 
 
 
 
 
 
 
 
 
 
 
 
 
 
 
 
 
 
 
 
 
 
 
 
 
 
 
 
 
 
 
 
 
 
 
 
 
 
 
 
 
 
 .

Web-sources

External links

 Encyclopædia Britannica, Epistemology (philosophy)
 Bruce Hood (2012), What is the Self Illusion? An interview with Sam Harris

Mystical union
Neo-Vedanta
Nondualism
Philosophical analogies
Religious practices
Spirituality